Arundhati Nair is an Indian actress who is known for her work in Tamil and Malayalam films.

Career 
Arundhati starred in Ponge Ezhu Manohara (2014) and Virumandikum Sivanandikum (2016) before gaining recognition for her role as Vijay Antony's wife in Saithan (2016). In a review of the film by the Deccan Chroncicle, the critic noted that "Arundhati Nair too has played two good characters and she deserves good praise". She debuted in Malayalam with Ottakoru Kaamukan (2018) and portrayed the love interest if Shine Tom Chacko in the film. She plays one of the female leads in Pistha opposite Shirish Saravanan.

Filmography 
Films

 Television serials

 Web series

References

External links 

Actresses in Tamil cinema
Actresses in Malayalam cinema
Year of birth missing (living people)
Living people
Indian film actresses
21st-century Indian actresses